Russell is a suburb of Canberra, Australia in the North Canberra district. Russell is one of the smallest suburbs in Canberra, comprising a number of government offices but no private residences. It is probably best known for the headquarters of the Australian Defence Force, which is housed in the Russell Offices complex.

It is bounded by Morshead Drive, Parkes Way and Constitution Avenue. Mount Pleasant lies just to the east, between Russell and Duntroon (which is part of the suburb of Campbell). The Australian American War Memorial is located in Russell. To the west lies Kings Park and Grevillea Park, on the shore of Lake Burley Griffin.

The suburb name has been associated with the locality for many years; Surveyor Charles Scrivener gave the name 'Russell' to an adjacent trigonometrical station in about 1910 and later adopted the name for an early settlement in the locality. The streets in Russell are named after armed services personnel.

Geology

Most of Russell is dominated by the lowest layer of the  Ainslie Volcanics, a grey dacite and other erupted particles such as agglomerate and tuff.
Tertiary age pebbly gravels are around Parkes Way left from when the Molonglo river was at a higher level.

References

Suburbs of Canberra